Majuro is the capital and largest city of the Marshall Islands. It is also a large coral atoll of 64 islands in the Pacific Ocean. It forms a legislative district of the Ratak (Sunrise) Chain of the Marshall Islands. As with other atolls in the Marshall Islands, Majuro consists of narrow land masses.

Majuro has been inhabited by humans for at least 2,000 years and was first settled by the Austronesian ancestors of the modern day Marshallese people. In 1885, the Marshall Islands were annexed by the German Empire and Majuro became their first and primary trading post. The city has also been under Japanese and American administration. After the Marshall Islands broke away from the Federated States of Micronesia in 1978 to form the Republic of the Marshall Islands, Majuro became the new country's capital and meeting place of the Nitijeļā, supplanting the former capital of Jaluit.

The main population center, Delap-Uliga-Djarrit (DUD), is made up of three contiguous motus and has a population of 20,301 people . Majuro has a port, shopping district, and various hotels. Majuro has an international airport with scheduled international flights to Hawaii, Federated States of Micronesia, Kiribati, Guam, and Nauru, and flights to domestic destinations around the country. Its economy is primarily service sector-dominated.

Geography

Djarrit is mostly residential.

Climate 
Being slightly north of the Equator, Majuro has a tropical rainforest climate (Af) but not an equatorial climate because trade winds are prevailing throughout the year though they are frequently interrupted during the summer months by the movement of the Intertropical Convergence Zone across the area. Typhoons are rare. Very rarely does the temperature fall below .

History

The atoll has been inhabited for at least 2,000 years by Austronesian peoples, including the ancestors of modern-day Marshallese residents.

Majuro Atoll was claimed by the German Empire with the rest of the Marshall Islands in 1884, and the Germans established a trading post. As with the rest of the Marshalls, Majuro was captured by the Imperial Japanese Navy in 1914 during World War I and mandated to the Empire of Japan by the League of Nations in 1920. The island then became a part of the Japanese mandated territory of the South Seas Mandate; although the Japanese had established a government in the Mandate, local affairs were mostly left in the hands of traditional local leaders until the start of World War II.

On January 30, 1944, United States Armed Forces invaded, but found that Japanese forces had evacuated their fortifications to Kwajalein and Enewetak about a year earlier. A single Japanese warrant officer had been left as a caretaker. With his capture, the islands were secured. This gave the U.S. Navy use of one of the largest anchorages in the Central Pacific. The lagoon became a large forward naval base, Naval Base Majuro, and was the largest and most active port in the world until the war moved westward when it was supplanted by Ulithi (Yap, Federated States of Micronesia).

Following World War II, Majuro came under the control of the United States as part of the Trust Territory of the Pacific Islands. After the Marshall Islands broke away from the Federated States of Micronesia in 1978 to form the Republic of the Marshall Islands, Majuro became the new country's capital and meeting place of the Nitijeļā, the legislature of the Marshall Islands. It supplanted Jaluit Atoll as the administrative center of the Marshall Islands, a status that it retains after the independence of the Marshall Islands in 1986 under a Compact of Free Association.

The island was also the site of the Majuro Declaration, a declaration by the Pacific Islands Forum  signed on 5 September 2013, to make a unified action on climate change adaptation and international aid.

Demographics
The major population centers are the D–U–D communities: the islets of Delap–Uliga–Djarrit (listed from south to north, on the eastern edge of the atoll). , Majuro had a population of 27,797.

Religion
Most of the population is Christian. The majority are Protestant and follow the United Church of Christ (47%), Assembly of God (16%) and others such as Bukot Nan Jesus (5%), Full Gospel (3%), Reformed Congressional Church (3%), the Salvation Army (2%), Seventh-Day Adventist (1%), and Meram in Jesus (1%). 8% of the population are Catholic, with the Cathedral of the Assumption of the Roman Catholic Apostolic Prefecture of the Marshall Islands located in Majuro.

Islamic influence has been increasing. There are a sizable number of Ahmadi Muslims. The first mosque opened in Majuro in September 2012.

There are also LDS churches, Baptist churches, and Jehovah's Witnesses.

Economy
Majuro's economy is driven by the service sector, which composed 86% of the GDP in 2011.

On September 15, 2007, Witon Barry, of the Tobolar Copra processing plant in the Marshall Islands' capital of Majuro, said power authorities, private companies and entrepreneurs had been experimenting with coconut oil as an alternative to diesel fuel for vehicles, power generators, and ships. Coconut trees abound in the Pacific's tropical islands. Copra from 6 to 10 coconuts makes 1 litre of oil.

Air Marshall Islands has its headquarters in Majuro.

Education

Colleges and universities

The College of the Marshall Islands is located in Uliga. The University of South Pacific has a presence on Majuro.

Primary and secondary schools
Marshall Islands Public School System operates public schools.

High schools:
 The Marshall Islands High School is near the north end of Majuro.
 Laura High School 
 Life Skills Academy

Primary schools:
 Ajeltake Elementary School
 Delap Elementary School
 DUD Kindergarten 
 Ejit Elementary School
 Laura Elementary School
 Long Island Elementary School
 Majuro Middle School
 Rairok Elementary School
 Rita Elementary School
 Uliga Elementary School
 Woja Maj. Elementary School
 Carl Kuli Lobat. Elementary School

In the 1994–1995 school year Majuro had 10 private elementary schools and six private high schools.

There is a Seventh Day Adventist High School and Elementary School in Delap, where English is taught to all students.

Health
The 81-bed Majuro Hospital is the main hospital for Majuro, as well as many of the outer islands. The country's only other major hospital is on Ebeye Island.

Infrastructure

Water and sewage
The Majuro Water and Sewer Company obtains water from a catchment basin on the International Airport runway. Water is supplied 12 hours daily. The threat of drought is commonplace.

Transport

Air
Marshall Islands International Airport, offering domestic and international services, is on Majuro. It is served by four passenger airlines: United Airlines, Nauru Airlines, Air Marshall Islands, and Asia Pacific Airlines.

Air Marshall Islands flies to most of the Marshalls' inhabited atolls once a week. It offers daily service between Majuro and Kwajalein, except Thursdays and Sundays.

Sea
Majuro Lagoon is an active port. It is one of the busiest tuna transshipment ports in the world, with 306,796 tons of tuna being moved from purse seine vessels to carrier vessels in 2018.

The Marshall Islands Shipping Corporation was established by the Marshall Islands via the Marshall Islands Shipping Corporation Act 2004. It manages several government ships that move people and freight around the islands. These ships include three older ships (Langidrik, Aemman, and Ribuuk Ae), as well as two newer ships (Majuro, Kwajalein) which were donated to the Republic of the Marshall Islands by Japan in 2013. They also operate a landing craft (Jelejeletae). These vessels are the main link for transporting people and supplies to and from the outer islands.

Additionally, the lagoon acts as a harbor for commercial fishing vessels, cruise ships, sport fishing boats, outrigger canoes and the occasional luxury yacht.

Sport
Majuro was initially scheduled to host the seventh edition of the Micronesian Games, in 2010. It subsequently renounced its hosting rights, citing a lack of adequate infrastructure. In 2018, the Marshall Islands were awarded the 2022 Micro Games, and a new stadium is being built in Majuro. (In 2021, it was decided to move back the Games a year, to 2023.) The new stadium is also expected to host soccer matches, which will be a first step in forming the Marshall Islands' first-ever national soccer team.

Weightlifter Mattie Langtor Sasser competed for the Marshall Islands in the 2016 Summer Olympics, participating in the Women's 58 kg category on August 8.

Twin towns
Majuro is twinned with:
 Inalåhan, Guam, United States, since 1973
 Kawai, Nara, Japan
 Taipei, Republic of China (Taiwan), since 1999
  Basco, Philippines
  Luganville, Vanuatu
  Weno, Micronesia
  Tamuning, Guam, United States
  Tarawa, Kiribati
  Honiara, Solomon Islands 
  Nuku'alofa, Tonga

References

External links

 Marshall Islands site
 
 Recent photos of the rural portions of Majuro
 World War II photos of Majuro
 Battle of Kwajalein and Enewetak 

 
Atolls of the Marshall Islands
Capitals in Oceania
Pacific Ocean theatre of World War II
Populated places in the Marshall Islands
Ratak Chain
United States Navy in World War II
1884 establishments in Oceania
Populated places established in 1884